Koohrang (also known as Kouhrang and Kurang) is the name of a river, originating in the Zagros mountains of western Iran, which joins the Beheštābād river to form the Karun, Iran's largest (by volume) river. A series of tunnels (Kuhrang Tunnels) have been built since the 1950s to redirect some of the Kuhrang's water toward the Zayandeh River to meet the demands of increased population in Esfahan and Yazd provinces.

Two additional tunnels (Kurang 2 and Kurang 3) were constructed in late 1990s and early 2000s. Dams have deleterious effects on a riverine fish and other fauna and are often stocked with exotic species. The upper Karun has not been well explored for endemic taxa.

References

Rivers of Chaharmahal and Bakhtiari province
Chaharmahal and Bakhtiari Province
Khuzestan Province